Poet Saint may refer to:

 Sant Mat, one of the group of teachers of the Indian subcontinent beginning in the 13th century
 The Contemporary Sant Mat movements claiming connection to Sant Mat
 Du Fu, Chinese poet during the Tang dynasty
Milarepa, a Tibetan Buddhist

There are several poet theologians of 4th to 6th century Syriac literature